Viterbo University is a private Catholic university in La Crosse, Wisconsin. Founded in 1890 by the Franciscan Sisters of Perpetual Adoration, Viterbo is home to three colleges with nine schools offering 48 academic programs at the associate, bachelor's, master's, and doctoral levels.

Viterbo is one of 23 Franciscan universities in the United States, with 2,521 undergraduate and graduate students and over 23,000 alumni. As of 2020, Viterbo's endowment was a record $55.7 million. Viterbo is a member of the NAIA and the North Star Athletic Association; its athletic teams are known as the V-Hawks.

History
In 1890, the Franciscan Sisters of Perpetual Adoration founded St. Rose Normal School, a school to prepare religious sisters to teach in elementary schools. College courses were later introduced in 1923 as Viterbo began laying the foundation to evolve into a four-year degree-granting institution. About 10 years later, Viterbo developed a four-year college program, and by the 1931-32 school year became known as St. Rose Junior College with authorization from the University of Wisconsin–Madison. By 1939, Viterbo received approval as a four-year degree-granting institution for the preparation of teachers for elementary schools  Around this time, the school was renamed Viterbo College, reflecting its evolving and expanding educational offerings. In 1940, Viterbo College held its first commencement exercises with certification from the State Department of Public Instruction.

During the 1950s, Viterbo continued to expand its liberal arts offerings and in 1952 it received accreditation from the University of Wisconsin Committee on College Accreditation, becoming a four-year liberal arts college. Since 1954, Viterbo had been accredited by the North Central Association of Colleges and Secondary Schools. Today it is fully accredited by the Higher Learning Commission, among many other commissions and groups.

On September 4, 2000, the college was renamed Viterbo University to reflect its growth into a comprehensive university with robust graduate and undergraduate offerings, including outreach programs. In 2013, the university's first doctoral program was introduced, in nursing practice.

Campus

Viterbo's campus is on 21 acres of land in the Midtown district of La Crosse, Wisconsin, minutes from the city's downtown. The urban, 18-building campus is landlocked within the city's Washburn neighborhood. Viterbo also has a satellite campus in Des Moines, Iowa.

Centered around the historic St. Rose of Viterbo Convent, originally built in 1871 and rebuilt in 1923 after a fire, Viterbo's campus is compact. The first building to bear the Viterbo name hosted its first classes in January 1942. In 1972, the building was named Murphy Center in honor of W. Leo Murphy, a longtime Viterbo supporter and the first chair of the Board of Advisors.

In 1971, Viterbo's Fine Arts Center was completed. In 1987, the Varsity Athletic Center was built. In 2004, the D.B. and Marge Reinhart Center for Ethics, Science, and Technology was completed, and in 2005 the Amie L. Mathy Center expansion to the 1987 athletics building was completed. The Mathy Center is a collaboration between Viterbo and the local Boys and Girls Clubs of La Crosse—the first such effort in the country. A remodeling of the Todd Wehr Memorial Library within the main academic building, Murphy Center, was completed in 2006, and the school bookstore was remodeled in the summer of 2006. Between 2009 and 2011, the Student Union was remodeled at the expense of the Student Government Association, in collaboration with the Residence Hall Council. The remodel included upgrades to the security desk, flooring, computer area, television, and furniture.

The School of Nursing Building, which opened in 2011, has simulation labs dedicated to critical care, medical/surgical, maternal newborn care, child health care, nutrition and dietetics. Since 2013, Viterbo has shared space at the Weber Center for the Performing Arts, a 30,000-square-foot facility in downtown La Crosse, and the newest university facility.

The Viterbo University facilities in operation are:

 San Damiano Chapel (1914, built as St. Wenceslaus Catholic Church)
 Sister Thea Bowman Center, home to campus ministry (1926, built as St. Wenceslaus Catholic Church rectory)
 Murphy Center (1941)
 Brophy Center (1954, built as St. Wenceslaus School)
 Marian Hall (1957)
 Bonaventure Hall (1965)
 Fine Arts Center (1970)
 Treacy House (1975)
 McDonald Terrace (1975)
 Varsity Athletics Center (1987)
 Rose Terrace (1997)
 Outdoor Athletics Complex (1998)
 Physical Plant Building (2001)
 D.B. and Marge Reinhart Center for Ethics, Science, and Technology (2003)
 Amie L. Mathy Center for Recreation and Education (2005)
 School of Nursing Building (2011)
 Clare Apartments (2012)
 Weber Center for the Performing Arts (2013)

Student demographics
As of fall 2020, 2,521 students were enrolled at Viterbo. There were 1,630 undergraduates and 891 graduate students. Viterbo has a student/faculty ratio of 11:1 and an average class size of 16.

Athletics
Viterbo's athletic teams are called the V-Hawks. The university is a member of the National Association of Intercollegiate Athletics (NAIA), primarily competing in the North Star Athletic Association (NSAA) since the 2015–16 academic year; while its men's volleyball team competes as an affiliate member in the Chicagoland Collegiate Athletic Conference (CCAC). The V-Hawks competed in the defunct Midwest Collegiate Conference (MCC) from 1989–90 to 2014–15, when the conference dissolved.

Viterbo competes in 20 intercollegiate varsity sports. Men's sports include baseball, basketball, bowling, cross country, golf, soccer, track & field (indoor and outdoor) and volleyball; women's sports include basketball, bowling, cross country, golf, soccer, softball, track & field (indoor and outdoor) and volleyball; and co-ed sports include competitive dance and eSports.

Notable alumni
 Dolores Balderamos-Garcia, Belizean politician
 Thea Bowman, Catholic religious sister, teacher and scholar 
 Jorge Espat, Belizean politician
 Damian Miller, former Major League Baseball catcher
 Michelle Rifenberg, Minnesota state legislator
 Barry Lee Moe, Emmy Award-winning hairstylist

Notable faculty
Thea Bowman
Richard Ruppel

See also

St. Rose of Viterbo Convent
University of Wisconsin–La Crosse
Western Technical College

References

External links

 
 Official athletics website

 
Franciscan universities and colleges
Catholic universities and colleges in Wisconsin
Buildings and structures in La Crosse, Wisconsin
Education in La Crosse County, Wisconsin
Former women's universities and colleges in the United States
Association of Catholic Colleges and Universities
Educational institutions established in 1890
1890 establishments in Wisconsin
Roman Catholic Diocese of La Crosse